Bring It On Home… The Soul Classics is an album by Aaron Neville, in which he covers several classic soul songs that were made popular from 1957 to 1971. The album was released September 19, 2006, and reached No. 20 on the Billboard Top R&B/Hip-Hop Albums chart and No. 38 on the Billboard 200 chart dated October 6, 2006.

Track listing

Track information and credits adapted from the album's liner notes.

Personnel

Musicians 
 Aaron Neville – vocals
 Neil Larsen – acoustic piano, electric piano, organ, arrangements, horn arrangements, string arrangements (7)
 Ray Parker Jr. – electric guitar, backing vocals (9)
 Heitor Pereira – acoustic guitar, electric guitar
 Freddie Washington – bass, backing vocals (9)
 James Gadson – drums, backing vocals (9)
 Dan Higgins – saxophones
 David Woodford – saxophones
 Lee Thornburg – trumpet
 Stewart Levine – arrangements 
 Aaron Zigman – string arrangements (1-6, 8-14)

Additional musicians 
 Joe Sample – acoustic piano (3, 4, 5, 8, 14), electric piano (3, 4, 5, 8, 14)
 Art Neville – organ (10)
 Jack Ashford – tambourine (3, 6, 9, 12, 14)
 Lenny Castro – percussion (4, 5, 8, 10, 11)
 David Sanborn – saxophone (10)
 Chris Botti – trumpet (1)
 Mavis Staples – vocals (6)
 Chaka Khan – vocals (8)
 Jason Neville – backing vocals (6, 9, 14)
 Aaron Neville, Jr. – backing vocals (6, 9, 14)
 Arnold McCuller – backing vocals (6, 10, 14)
 Lamont Van Hook – backing vocals (6, 10, 14)
 Fred White – backing vocals (6, 10, 14)
 The Dixie Cups – backing vocals (6, 9, 12, 14):
 Barbara Anne Hawkins
 Rosa Lee Hawkins
 Athelgra Neville

Production 
 Stewart Levine – producer
 Joseph DiMuro – executive producer
 Rik Pekkonen – engineer, mixing
 Wesley Fontenot – engineer
 Mathieu LeJeune – engineer
 Dean Sharenow – engineer
 Matt Weeks – engineer
 Wesley Seidman – assistant engineer
 Bernie Grundman – mastering at Bernie Grundman Mastering (Hollywood, CA)
 Pete Ganbarg – A&R
 Rich Davis – production coordination
 Jennifer Liebeskind – project direction  
 Tony Ward – project direction  
 Jeff Schulz – art direction, design 
 Danny Clinch – photography 
 Kyoko Motonaga – grooming 
 April Johnson – stylist 
 David Ritz – sleeve notes 
 Kent Sorrell – management

Charts

References

2006 albums
Aaron Neville albums
Covers albums